Zorawar Singh may refer to:

 Zorawar Singh (Dogra general), general of Raja Gulab Singh
 Zorawar Singh (Sikhism), third son of Guru Gobind Singh
 Kanwar Zorawar Singh, Indian Army general